George Haddow (December 10, 1833 – November 11, 1919) was a Canadian politician and merchant.

Born in Douglastown, New Brunswick, Canada, the son of Robert Haddow and Elizabeth Taylor, he was educated in Northumberland County and became a merchant in Dalhousie. In 1859, Haddow married Elizabeth McCurdy. He was acclaimed in a by-election, upon George Moffatt's resignation, to the House of Commons of Canada as an independent MP to represent the riding of Restigouche. He was acclaimed in the 1878 election. He lost both the elections of 1882 and 1887.

References 

1833 births
1919 deaths
Independent MPs in the Canadian House of Commons
Members of the House of Commons of Canada from New Brunswick